The Flag of Rutland is the flag of the English county of Rutland. It was registered with the Flag Institute on 17 November 2015.



History
The flag is a banner of the arms of Rutland County Council, which were granted to the council in 1950.  The description is vert, semée of acorns, a horseshoe or. The crest is on a wreath of the colours, in front of a horseshoe an acorn or, leaved and slipped proper.

When Rutland regained its status as a county in 1997, a banner of the arms was raised to demonstrate the restoration of status.

Design
The horseshoe has traditionally been the symbol of Oakham since William the Conqueror gave the  estate to Henry de Ferrers, whose family name suggests a connection with iron-working or the farrier occupation. One of his privileges was to claim the forfeit of a horseshoe from anyone of rank visiting his lordship in Oakham. A unique collection of horseshoes presented by royalty and peers of the realm passing through the manor, hangs on the walls of the Hall in Oakham Castle.

The acorn exemplifies the former forest, which at one time covered much of the county. It can also be interpreted as representing "smallness and importance" and the oaks suggested by the name of Oakham. The green field represents the county's agriculture, especially its rich pastureland.

The orientation of the horseshoe is in accordance with tradition in the county, and the horseshoes in the Castle are hung this way up.

References

Rutland
Rutland
Rutland